The President of the Regional Government of Extremadura is the head of government of the Spanish autonomous community of Extremadura. 

Guillermo Fernández Vara from PSOE is the current President of the Regional Government of Extremadura; he was elected with the support of Podemos.

List of officeholders

References

 
Extremadura
1978 establishments in Spain